Daryna Pikuleva (born 29 August 1996) is a Belarusian sprint canoeist. She qualified in the women's K-4 500 metres events at the 2020 Summer Olympics.

References

1996 births
Living people
Belarusian female canoeists
Canoeists at the 2020 Summer Olympics
Olympic canoeists of Belarus
21st-century Belarusian women